Tweed Valley Forest Park is forest park in the border region of Scotland. It consists of a network of eight forests managed by Forestry and Land Scotland (FLS) spread along the valley of the River Tweed, and which are managed with an emphasis on recreational facilities for visitors.

At each location there is a car park and waymarked trails for visitors. Some of the site have more facilities, such as toilets and mountain bike trails. The eight forests are:
Caberston
Cademuir
Cardrona
Glenkinnon
Glentress - also part of the 7stanes network of mountain bike centres
Innerleithen - also part of the 7stanes network of mountain bike centres
Thornielee
Yair

References

External links
Tweed Valley Forest Park - Forestry and Land Scotland

Forests and woodlands of Scotland
Protected areas in the Scottish Borders
Tourist attractions in the Scottish Borders
Forest parks of Scotland